Ahmed Al-Shaji (Arabic:أحمد الشاجي) (born 3 May 1986) is an Emirati footballer. He currently plays as a goalkeeper for Al-Hamriyah .

External links

References

Emirati footballers
1986 births
Living people
Emirates Club players
Al Jazirah Al Hamra Club players
Ras Al Khaimah Club players
Al Hamriyah Club players
Place of birth missing (living people)
UAE First Division League players
UAE Pro League players
Association football goalkeepers